Enrico "Koy" Banal, is a Filipino professional basketball head coach.

Coaching career
Prior to his first PBA coaching job, Banal has had extensive head coaching experience in the collegiate and amateur ranks. He called the shots for the PSBA Jaguars in the late 90s with ex-pro Warren Ybanez as his main man.  From 2000-2004, he was the head coach of the FEU Tamaraws in the UAAP, bannered by future PBA MVP Arwind Santos, Denok Miranda, Mark Isip, Cesar Catli. He won two championships for FEU from 2003 to 2004 (Due to La Salle's ineligible players which led them to give up the 2004 championship trophy due to the scandal that leaked out the following year and forfeiting all their wins from 2003-2005).

Midway through the 2005 NCAA season, he was hired as head coach of the San Beda Red Lions, and in 2006, he guided the team to their first championship after 28 years. He was awarded as Coach of the Year.  Citing differences with the management, he was unceremoniously dumped as head coach of the Red Lions in 2007.

He then jumped to the pros as an assistant coach to Ryan Gregorio at Purefoods, and back in the collegiate ranks in 2011, coaching his college alma mater Arellano University. After his stint at Arellano in 2013, he was appointed assistant coach to Siot Tanquincen and was then promoted to head coach a day before the start of the 2014-15 PBA season replacing Tanquincen. On May 31, 2016, Banal was fired by the Phoenix Fuel Masters after rumors emerged that Banal was going to return to one of the teams San Miguel Corporation owned (Barangay Ginebra San Miguel, San Miguel Beermen, and Star Hotshots). He was replaced by former Westports Malaysia Dragons Ariel Vanguardia.

To this date, he is one of only a handful of coaches to win championships in both UAAP and NCAA.

Coaching record

Collegiate record

Personal life

Banal is the younger brother of former PBA, UAAP and NCAA coach Joel Banal and has a son Jonathan Banal, a former point guard for the Mapúa Cardinals in the NCAA.

References

Living people
Filipino men's basketball coaches
Barako Bull Energy Boosters coaches
Arellano University alumni
Year of birth missing (living people)
FEU Tamaraws basketball coaches
San Beda Red Lions basketball coaches
Arellano Chiefs basketball coaches
Phoenix Super LPG Fuel Masters coaches
Magnolia Hotshots coaches
San Miguel Beermen coaches